Philippe Bonnardel (28 July 1899 – 17 February 1953) was a French international footballer. He is mostly known for his international career and his club stint at Red Star FC where he won three straight Coupe de France titles from 1921–1923. Bonnardel made his international debut on 29 February 1920 in a 2–0 victory over Switzerland. He was a member of the France team that participated in the football tournament at the 1924 Summer Olympics. In his final match as an international, he wore the armband in a 4–0 defeat to Portugal.

References 

1899 births
1953 deaths
Association football midfielders
French footballers
France international footballers
Olympic footballers of France
Footballers at the 1924 Summer Olympics
Red Star F.C. players
US Quevilly-Rouen Métropole players